Frank Dominick Cipriani (April 14, 1941 – June 7, 2022) was an American professional baseball outfielder whose career extended from 1960 through 1966. He was born in Buffalo, New York, and was an alumnus of Fordham University.

Cipriani's September 1961 MLB audition came in his sophomore year as a pro, after he had spent the minor-league season with the Shreveport Sports of the Double-A Southern Association. In his debut for the Athletics, he started in right field against Jim Kaat of the Minnesota Twins, and singled twice off Kaat in a 6–4 Kansas City win. He started in right field in ten more games through October 1 in his only MLB service.

As a big leaguer, Cipriani posted a .250 batting average (9-for-36) with two runs and two RBI in 20 games, without extrabases or stolen bases.

Cipriani died June 7, 2022.

See also
1961 Kansas City Athletics season

References

External links

1941 births
2022 deaths
Albuquerque Dukes players
Baseball players from Buffalo, New York
Binghamton Triplets players
Birmingham Barons players
Fordham Rams baseball players
Kansas City Athletics players
Lewiston Broncs players
Major League Baseball right fielders
Modesto Reds players
Portland Beavers players
Sanford Greyhounds players
Shreveport Sports players
Tidewater Tides players